Galip Haktanır (born 1 August 1921) is a Turkish footballer. He played in five matches for the Turkey national football team from 1948 to 1950. He was also part of Turkey's squad for the football tournament at the 1948 Summer Olympics, but he did not play in any matches.

References

External links
 

1921 births
Living people
Turkish footballers
Turkey international footballers
Association football defenders
Turkish centenarians
Vefa S.K. footballers